Kalis is a surname. Notable people with this surname include:

Kyle Kalis, American footballer
Henry Kalis, American politician
Josh Kalis, American skateboarder
Sterre Kalis, Dutch cricketeer
Todd Kalis, American footballer

See also

Kali (name)
Khalis (name), given name and surname